Dobric may refer to:

 Dobrich, a town in Bulgaria
 Dobrić, a village in Serbia
 Dobříč (Plzeň-North District), a village in the Plzeň Region, Czech Republic
 Dobříč (Prague-West District), a village in the Central Bohemian Region, Czech Republic
 Dobrić, Kosovo,, a village near Gjakova in Kosovo, Serbia
 Dobric, a village in Căianu Mic Commune, Bistrița-Năsăud County, Romania
 Dobric (river), a river in Maramureș County, Romania

See also 
 Dobrich (disambiguation)